White Surinamese or European Surinamese are Surinamese people whose ancestry lies within the continent of Europe.

As of 2013, people of solely European descent are a small minority in Suriname, accounting for only 5,700 people or 1% of the country's population. The largest European ethnic groups in Suriname are the Dutch and the Portuguese.

See also
 Dutch Surinamese
 Portuguese Surinamese
 History of the Jews in Suriname

References and footnotes 

 
 
White culture in South America